Yoel Rodríguez Oterino (born 28 August 1988), known simply as Yoel, is a Spanish professional footballer who plays for SD Eibar as a goalkeeper.

He played 82 La Liga games for Celta, Valencia, Rayo Vallecano, Eibar and Valladolid, almost exclusively as back-up.

Club career

Celta
Born in Vigo, Pontevedra, Galicia, Yoel was a product of local RC Celta de Vigo's youth academy. He was promoted to the first team for the 2009–10 season, with the team in the Segunda División. On 10 February 2010, following a string of good performances in that year's Copa del Rey, he was called up to the Spain under-21 side training camp by manager Juan Ramón López Caro.

Yoel was first choice in the 2011–12, playing 25 games in a return to La Liga after five years. For the following campaign, however, he was loaned to neighbouring CD Lugo also in the second tier.

Yoel returned to Celta for 2013–14, making his top-flight debut on 19 August in a 2–2 home draw against RCD Espanyol.

Valencia
On 31 July 2014, Yoel was loaned to Valencia CF for one year, with the club having an obligatory option to buy him permanently at the end of this period. He made his competitive debut on 19 October, starting in the 3–0 away loss against Deportivo de La Coruña.

On 19 November 2015, after making no appearances during the season despite the injuries of both Diego Alves and Mathew Ryan, Yoel was loaned to Rayo Vallecano until June to make up for Toño's serious injury, with a buyout clause. On 20 December, he was in goal at the Santiago Bernabéu Stadium, but his team had to play with nine players for more than 60 minutes and were eventually crushed 10–2 by hosts Real Madrid.

Eibar
Yoel joined top-flight SD Eibar on 11 July 2016, on loan and again with an option to buy. On 23 May 2017, he agreed to a permanent deal for a reported €750,000.

In June 2017, Yoel suffered a knee ligament injury while exercising, ruling him out for six months. On 30 August 2018, having spent the remainder of the campaign as a backup to Marko Dmitrović, he renewed his contract until 2021 and was immediately loaned to Real Valladolid for one year. He spent most of that season on the bench behind Jordi Masip, and when chosen to play against Deportivo Alavés on 19 April 2019, he made errors in a 2–2 away draw.

In December 2020, having not recovered his position from the Serb, Yoel extended his link until June 2024. The following summer, as the former moved to Sevilla FC, Ander Cantero arrived as competition at the relegated Basque club.

References

External links

Celta de Vigo biography 

1988 births
Living people
Spanish footballers
Footballers from Vigo
Association football goalkeepers
La Liga players
Segunda División players
Segunda División B players
Celta de Vigo B players
RC Celta de Vigo players
CD Lugo players
Valencia CF players
Rayo Vallecano players
SD Eibar footballers
Spain youth international footballers